Callum Henry McManaman (born 25 April 1991) is an English professional footballer who plays as a winger, most recently for Tranmere Rovers.

Born in Whiston, Merseyside, lived and brought up in Rainhill, Merseyside, McManaman began his youth career at Everton before being released in 2007 and joining Wigan Athletic. He made his first team debut in 2009, and was the man of the match as they won the FA Cup in 2013. In January 2015, he joined West Bromwich Albion for £4.75 million.
On 13 October 2020, McManaman signed a two-year contract with A-League club Melbourne Victory ahead of the 2020–21 A-League season.

Club career

Wigan Athletic
McManaman was born in Huyton. He grew up as an Everton supporter, and joined the club's youth system when he was seven years old. After being released by the club at the age of sixteen, he signed for Wigan Athletic on a free transfer in 2007. He made his debut for the reserves toward the end of the 2007–08 season. He became a regular in the reserve team during the second half of the following season, appearing ten times and scoring four goals. He then made his first team debut on 24 May 2009 in a Premier League match against Portsmouth, becoming Wigan's youngest-ever player to play in the Premier League.

In July 2009, he signed his first professional contract with the club. McManaman remained in the reserve team during the 2009–10 season, scoring twice in a 5–0 win against Burnley. Although he did not appear in the first team, he earned a contract extension.

McManaman was an unused substitute in the first team at the start of the 2010–11 season, but Wigan manager Roberto Martínez felt the player was not yet ready for Premier League football. On 30 November 2010, he made his first appearance in over 18 months when he came on as a substitute in a League Cup match against Arsenal. Martínez suggested the player would feature more regularly later in the season. He scored his first goal for Wigan in his first start for the club against Hull City in the FA Cup on 8 January 2011. In April 2011, he extended his contract for a further two years, keeping him at the club until 2013.

On 17 October 2011, McManaman joined Blackpool in a three-month loan deal. He made his debut a day later, appearing as a substitute against Doncaster Rovers, and made his first start for the club in the following game against Nottingham Forest. On 3 December 2011, he scored his first league goal in a 1–0 win against Reading.
After he returned from his loan spell at Blackpool, McManaman scored against Swindon Town in the FA Cup on 7 January 2012. He returned to Premier League football at the DW Stadium on 16 January 2012 as an 81st-minute substitute in a single-goal defeat to Manchester City.

McManaman scored as a substitute in the 89th minute in Wigan's first League Cup game of the 2012–13 season, capping off a 1–4 win over Nottingham Forest. In January 2013, he signed a new contract with Wigan until 2016. On 17 February 2013, in the fifth round of the FA Cup, McManaman scored one goal and was named man-of-the-match in a 4–1 win against Huddersfield Town, helping Wigan reach the quarter-finals for the first time in 26 years. In that quarter-final match, he scored against his former club Everton, at Goodison Park, in a 3–0 win that sent Wigan to the semi-finals at Wembley.

After the Everton game, McManaman made his first Premier League start against Newcastle United on 17 March 2013. His challenge on Massadio Haïdara in that game was the subject of a two-day review by The Football Association; the Association concluded it lacked the authority to penalise McManaman retrospectively. On 23 March 2013, The Daily Telegraph reported that the McManaman situation had prompted the FA "... to raise the issue with the other 'stakeholders' involved in setting disciplinary guidelines ... at the end of the season."

On 27 April 2013, he scored his first Premier League goal for Wigan in a 2–2 draw against Tottenham Hotspur. A week later, he scored the winning goal in a 3–2 win against West Bromwich Albion. On 11 May, he was named man-of-the-match in the FA Cup Final, leading Wigan to a 1–0 victory over Manchester City.

West Bromwich Albion
On 28 January 2015, McManaman signed for Premier League club West Bromwich Albion on a three-and-a-half-year contract for £4.75 million. He was the first signing for the club by Tony Pulis.

On 27 December 2016, McManaman signed for Championship club Sheffield Wednesday on loan for the remainder of the season. He played in their first match of 2017 against Wolverhampton Wanderers on 2 January.

Sunderland
McManaman signed for Championship club Sunderland on 31 August 2017 on a two-year contract for an undisclosed fee. He scored his first goal for Sunderland with a 96th-minute equaliser in a 3–3 draw with Middlesbrough on 24 February 2018.

Return to Wigan Athletic
On 20 July 2018, McManaman returned to his boyhood club Wigan Athletic for an undisclosed fee, signing onto a one-year rolling contract.

Luton Town
On 4 June 2019, McManaman signed for newly promoted Championship club Luton Town on a free transfer. He was released at the end of the 2019–20 season.

Melbourne Victory
On 13 October 2020, McManaman signed a two-year contract with A-League club Melbourne Victory ahead of the 2020–21 A-League season. In July 2021, he was released by Melbourne Victory, with one-year left on his contract.

Tranmere Rovers 
On 9 July, it was announced that McManaman had made a return to English football, signing with League Two side Tranmere Rovers on a one-year deal. McManaman was released at the end of the 2021–22 season.

International career
McManaman is available to represent England and the Republic of Ireland, through Irish ancestry.

In June 2011, McManaman, along with teammate Lee Nicholls, was included in the England under-20s squad for the 2011 FIFA U-20 World Cup, the first time a Wigan Athletic player has been involved in the tournament. He made his debut in a group match – a 0–0 draw against North Korea, and went on to play in all of England's games during the tournament before the team were knocked out by Nigeria.

On 14 May, he was called up for the first time to the England Under 21s for the 2013 UEFA European Under-21 Football Championship in Israel. However, he was ruled out of the tournament due to an ankle injury picked up in a game against Arsenal on the same day.

Personal life
McManaman is a distant relative of former Liverpool, Real Madrid, Manchester City and England player Steve McManaman.

Career statistics

Honours
Wigan Athletic
FA Cup: 2012–13

References

External links

1991 births
Living people
People from Rainhill
Footballers from Merseyside
English footballers
England youth international footballers
Association football wingers
Everton F.C. players
Wigan Athletic F.C. players
Blackpool F.C. players
West Bromwich Albion F.C. players
Sheffield Wednesday F.C. players
Sunderland A.F.C. players
Luton Town F.C. players
Melbourne Victory FC players
Tranmere Rovers F.C. players
Premier League players
English Football League players
A-League Men players
English people of Irish descent
FA Cup Final players
English expatriate footballers
English expatriate sportspeople in Australia
Expatriate soccer players in Australia